Crew Dragon Endeavour (Dragon capsule C206) is a Crew Dragon spacecraft manufactured and operated by SpaceX and used by NASA's Commercial Crew Program.  it has successfully completed three crewed missions to the International Space Station (ISS). It was first launched into orbit atop a Falcon 9 rocket on 30 May 2020 and successfully docked to the International Space Station (ISS) as part of the Crew Dragon Demo-2 mission. This was the first crewed flight test of a Dragon capsule, carrying Doug Hurley and Bob Behnken on first crewed orbital spaceflight from the United States since STS-135 in July 2011 and the first crewed orbital spaceflight by a private company. On 2 August 2020 it returned to Earth. The name Endeavour is also shared by the command module of Apollo 15. The spacecraft's second mission, Crew-2, ended 8 November 2021 after having spent almost 200 days in orbit. Crew Dragon Endeavour set the record for the longest spaceflight by a U.S. crew vehicle previously set by her sibling Crew Dragon Resilience on 2 May 2021. Collectively, Endeavour has spent 280 days in orbit and is the crewed space capsule with most time spent in orbit so far.

History 
After the success of Crew Dragon Demo-1 using Crew Dragon C204, that spacecraft was originally planned to be used for the Crew Dragon In-Flight Abort Test. However, on 20 April 2019, Crew Dragon C204 was destroyed in an explosion during static fire testing at the Landing Zone 1 facility. On the day of the anomaly, the initial testing of the Crew Dragon's Draco thrusters was successful, with the explosion occurring during the test of the SuperDraco abort system. Crew Dragon C205, then slated to be used for the Demo-2 mission, was subsequently used for the in-flight abort test. Endeavour, then, was assigned to the Demo-2 mission, replacing Crew Dragon C205. On 17 April 2020, NASA Administrator Jim Bridenstine announced the launch date of the crewed Crew Dragon mission to the International Space Station to be on 27 May 2020. According to SpaceX, Endeavour underwent electromagnetic interference testing and completed acoustic testing in February 2020. In early April 2020, the spacecraft was in SpaceX's processing facility at Cape Canaveral Space Force Station, Florida to undergo final processing and testing in preparation for the Demo-2 launch. It was then transported to Kennedy Space Center, arriving at the Launch Complex 39A on 15 May 2020. The spacecraft was then mated to a Falcon 9 rocket and was rolled out onto the launch pad on 21 May 2020, with static fire testing completed the next day.

Crew Dragon Endeavour, with its name still unannounced, was successfully launched on top of the rocket on 30 May 2020 after the scrubbing of the first attempt due to poor weather conditions. Astronauts Bob Behnken and Doug Hurley crewed the Demo-2 mission, marking the first crewed launch to the International Space Station from the United States since STS-135 in July 2011. The mission was intended to complete the validation of crewed spaceflight operations using SpaceX hardware. If successful, the demonstration flight would allow for human-rating certification of the Crew Dragon spacecraft, the Falcon 9 rocket, the crew transportation system, the launch pad, and SpaceX's capabilities. Additionally, each crew member brought along a toy from their family, in this case an Apatosaurus dinosaur named "Tremor", a sequined plush dinosaur toy, and a Ty flippables plush toy, continuing the tradition for astronauts to bring a plush toy or trinket aboard their spacecraft to serve as a zero-gravity indicator when weightlessness kicks in during spaceflight. Days after the successful launch, NASA gave SpaceX approval to reuse flight-proven spacecraft, indicating Endeavour may be potentially reused.

Endeavour docked with the ISS on 31 May 2020. Hurley and Behnken joined the ISS Expedition 63 crew, which consisted of NASA astronaut Chris Cassidy and Russian cosmonauts Ivan Vagner and Anatoli Ivanishin. Behnken and Hurley launched to the ISS for an indeterminate time frame, which depended on Endeavour'''s solar array degradation, the status of Crew Dragon Resilience, and landing zone weather. 

NASA originally planned Demo-2 as a short test flight lasting about two weeks, but later chose to extend the mission to address the shortfall of crew in the ISS. According to Ken Bowersox, acting administrator for NASA's human spaceflight program, the spacecraft was "doing very well" and NASA re-planned to bring the crew and Endeavour home in early August. When Endeavour returned, it journeyed through a fast fiery descent of Earth's atmosphere and was slowed down by the capsule's drogue chute and suite of parachutes. It splashed down in the Gulf of Mexico, near Pensacola, FL, where a SpaceX recovery boat brought the crew and spacecraft back to shore.

Bob Behnken and Doug Hurley left a Demo-2 patch on the inside of Endeavour after their mission. Shane Kimbrough announced that the Crew-2 astronauts will keep the "Endeavour" name for the spacecraft revealed by Hurley and Behnken shortly after their launch last May.

 Flights Endeavour was flown in space on the Crew Dragon Demo-2 mission on 30 May 2020, and returned to Earth on 2 August. The spacecraft was rated to spend 119 days in orbit, as its solar panels had less capability than a full production Crew Dragon capable of staying in space for up to 210 days. The seat of Bob Behnken in Endeavour'' during Demo-2 was used by his wife, K. Megan McArthur in the SpaceX Crew-2 mission.

References

External links 
 

SpaceX Dragon 2
Individual space vehicles
NASA spacecraft
Crewed spacecraft